The Exmouth spiny-tailed gecko (Strophurus rankini), also known commonly as Rankin's spiny-tailed gecko, is a species of lizard in the family Diplodactylidae. The species is endemic to Western Australia.

Etymology
The specific name, rankini, is in honor of Australian herpetologist Peter Rankin (1955–1979), who was collecting lizards at night in New Caledonia, when he fell from a tree and died.

Geographic range
S. rankini is found in the Exmouth Gulf region of coastal Western Australia, including Bernier Island.

Habitat
The natural habitat of S. rankini is shrubland in the supralittoral zone.

Description
The length of the tail is about two-thirds the SVL. Dorsally, S. rankini is pale gray, darker on the snout and lips. Ventrally, it is grayish white.

Reproduction
S. rankini is oviparous.

References

Further reading
Ellis RJ, Doughty P, Bauer AM (2018). "An annotated type catalogue of the geckos and pygopods (Squamata: Gekkota: Carphodactylidae, Diplodactylidae, Gekkonidae, Pygopodidae) in the collection of the Western Australian Museum". Records of the Western Australian Museum 33 (1): 051–094.
Cogger HG (2014). Reptiles and Amphibians of Australia, Seventh Edition. Clayton, Victoria, Australia: CSIRO Publishing. xxx + 1,033 pp. .
Laube A, Langner C (2007). "Die Gattung Strophurus". Draco 8 (29): 49–66. (in German).
Rösler H (2000). "Kommentierte Liste der rezent, subrezent und fossil bekannten Geckotaxa (Reptilia: Gekkonomorpha)". Gekkota 2: 28-153. (Strophurus rankini, p. 115). (in German).
Storr GM (1979). "Five new lizards from Western Australia". Records of the Western Australian Museum 8 (1): 134–142. (Diplodactylus rankini, new species, pp. 134–136, Plate 1).
Wilson, Steve; Swan, Gerry (2013). A Complete Guide to Reptiles of Australia, Fourth Edition. Sydney: New Holland Publishers. 522 pp. .

Strophurus
Reptiles described in 1979
Taxa named by Glen Milton Storr
Geckos of Australia